Amata croceizona is a moth of the subfamily Arctiinae. It was described by George Hampson in 1910. It is found in Zambia and Zimbabwe.

References

 

croceizona
Moths described in 1910
Moths of Africa